Newcastle station can refer to:
Miramichi station, a railway station that serves Newcastle, New Brunswick, Canada
Newcastle railway station, also known as Newcastle Central Station, the main railway station in the city of Newcastle upon Tyne, England
Newcastle railway station in Newcastle, New South Wales, Australia
Newcastle-under-Lyme railway station, in Newcastle-under-Lyme, Staffordshire, England (closed 1964)